The College of Sciences and Technology of Savannah State University offers the Masters of Science degree with a concentration on Marine Science and Bachelor of Science degrees with concentrations on civil engineering technology, computer science technology, electronics engineering technology, biology, chemistry, environmental studies, marine science, and mathematics. The college also collaborates with Georgia Tech to offer the Georgia Tech Regional Engineering Program (GREP), the Regents Engineering Transfer Program (RETP) and the Dual degree program.

Accreditation
Savannah State University's College of Sciences and Technology is accredited by the Commission on Colleges of the Southern Association of Colleges and Schools to offer bachelor's degrees and Marine Sciences degrees.

The Civil Engineering Technology programs are accredited by the Technology Accreditation Commission of the Accreditation Board for Engineering and Technology. The Electronics engineering technology program is accredited by the Technology Accreditation Commission of the Accreditation Board for Engineering and Technology and National Association of Radio and Telecommunications Engineers, Inc. The Mechanical Engineering Technology is accredited by the Technology Accreditation Commission of the Accreditation Board for Engineering and Technology. The Chemistry department is certified by the American Chemical Society.

Departments
Department of Engineering Technology
Department of Natural Sciences and Mathematics
Department of Naval Science (NROTC)
Department of Military Science (AROTC)

Degrees

Undergraduate majors
Biology
Chemistry
Civil Engineering Technology
Computer Science Technology
Electronics Engineering Technology
Electronics Engineering Technology (Computer Option)
Environmental Science
Mathematics
Marine Sciences

Graduate programs
Marine Sciences

Georgia Tech Regional Engineering Program
Students take the courses required in the freshman and sophomore classes of the Georgia Tech Engineering Degree Programs at SSU and upon successful completion of these classes they become Georgia Tech students. They continue courses in Savannah but graduate with a Georgia Tech Engineering Degree. Available degrees in the program include Civil Engineering, Computer Engineering, Electrical Engineering and Mechanical Engineering.

Footnotes

College of Sciences and Technology